The Advisory Council of Faculty Senates (ACFS) is a non-partisan statewide organization of university faculty members formed to represent the interests of all faculty members working for the State University System of Florida.  ACFS membership consists of two representatives from the faculty senate of each public university in the state, one of whom is typically thechair of the constituent university's faculty senate and thus serves on that university's board of trustees.  The chair of the ACFS serves on the Florida Board of Governors.

See also 
 Florida Student Association
 Florida Board of Governors
 State University System of Florida

External links
 Advisory Council of Faculty Senates 

State University System of Florida
Supraorganizations
University governance